Archdeacon James Brown Craven (1850 – 17 April 1924) was author of the History of the Church in Orkney and several other works on ecclesiastical history. He was a founder and the first president of the Orkney Antiquarian Society.

The son of Rev J E Craven, Free Church of Scotland minister at Newhills, near Aberdeen, he went to Orkney in 1876 to be rector of the newly built Episcopalian St.Olaf's Church in Kirkwall, and stayed there until his death. He was made Doctor of Divinity at Aberdeen University in 1908.

Craven was also the author of books on Hermetic alchemists, and mystic physicians including:

Doctor Robert Fludd (Robertus de Fluctibus), the English Rosicrucian: life and writings. 1890.
Count Michael Maier, doctor of philosophy and of medicine, alchemist, Rosicrucian, mystic, 1568–1622: life and writings. 1910.
Doctor Heinrich Khunrath: A Study in Mystical Alchemy. Published 1997. Adam McLean, Glasgow.

References
The Scotsman: Obituary, 19 April 1924

External links
 

1850 births
1924 deaths
People associated with Orkney
20th-century Scottish historians
Alumni of the University of Aberdeen
Place of birth missing
19th-century Scottish historians
Historians of Scotland
Scottish Episcopalian clergy